Piprozolin (or piprozoline) is a medication for bile therapy.

Synthesis
Compared to fenclozic acid, piprozolin shows choleretic rather than anti-inflammatory activity. That is, the compound is useful in those conditions where the flow of bile is to be increased.

Condensation of ethyl mercaptoacetate with ethyl cyanoacetate leads to thiazolinone (4); an intermediate such as 3, involving addition of the mercaptide to the nitrile function can reasonably be invoked. M/ethylation with di(m)ethyl sulfate proceeds on nitrogen with the concomitant shift of the enamine to afford olefin (5). Bromination of the active methylene (6) followed by displacement of halogen by piperidine affords the choleretic piprozolin (7).

References 

1-Piperidinyl compounds
Carboxylate esters
Thiazolidines
Lactams